Cihan Can (born August 1, 1986) is a Turkish professional footballer who currently plays as a defender for Ergene Velimeşe.

Career
Can was promoted to Galatasaray's first team from the youth team in 2005. He played in for the first team in friendly matches but did not play in any official matches. He was an unused substitute in Galatasaray's UEFA Cup first round loss to Tromsø IL.

He was loaned out to Sakaryaspor in the 2005–06 mid-season break. After a half season spell, he returned to Galatasaray. Can was again loaned out, to Mersin İdman Yurdu, for the 2006–07 season. For the 2007–08 season, he was loaned out to Orduspor. The following season, Galatasaray loaned Can to Gaziantep Büyükşehir Belediyespor, and he signed for the club permanently in January 2010.

References

External links

1986 births
Living people
Turkish footballers
Galatasaray S.K. footballers
Orduspor footballers
Sakaryaspor footballers
Gaziantep F.K. footballers
Turkey youth international footballers
TFF First League players
Association football defenders